John Thomas Allan (born 16 January 1883) was an English footballer. His regular position was as a forward. He was born in South Shields, County Durham. He played for Bishop Auckland and Manchester United.

External links
MUFCInfo.com profile

1883 births
Year of death missing
English footballers
Bishop Auckland F.C. players
Manchester United F.C. players
English Football League players
Association football forwards

Footballers from South Shields